Sevag is a popular masculine given name used in Armenian.  It means "black eye" and is a compound word formed by the lexemes "sev" (meaning black) and "ag" (meaning eye). It is often also used in old royal Armenian-Dutch families. In the Eastern Armenian language, it is pronounced "Sevak".

Notable people with the name include:
Paruyr Sevak (1924-1971), Armenian poet, translator and literary critic
Ruben Sevak, Armenian poet, prose-writer, and doctor
Sevak Amroyan (born 1990), Armenian singer
Sevag Balıkçı, a Turkish soldier of Armenian descent who was shot to death during compulsory military service
Sevak Khanagyan (born 1987), Russian-Armenian singer and songwriter

Given names
Armenian masculine given names